Paulina Flores Arias (born 1980 in Culiacán, Sinaloa) is a Mexican model, who after winning the national title of Nuestra Belleza México, represented her country in the 2000 Miss World pageant, held in London, England, on November 30, 2000. Paulina is currently a professional fashion model, and has been represented by several national and international modeling agencies.

External links
 Paulina Flores at the Fashion Model Directory

1980 births
Living people
Nuestra Belleza México winners
Miss World 2000 delegates
Models from Sinaloa
People from Culiacán
Mexican female models